These are the profiles and summaries for the individual stages in the 2011 Tour de France, with Stage 12 on 14 July, and Stage 21 on 24 July.

Stage 12
14 July 2011 — Cugnaux to Luz Ardiden, 

The first stage to enter the high mountains, the route included one first category (La Hourquette d'Ancizan, used by the tour for the first time), and two highest category climbs, and a summit finish.  The early breakaway, consisting of Geraint Thomas, Iván Gutiérrez, Rubén Pérez, Laurent Mangel, Blel Kadri and Jérémy Roy, established a maximum lead of nine minutes and preserved their lead over the first two climbs.  On the final climb, an attack by Jelle Vanendert and Samuel Sánchez was the first to overhaul the breakaway, and they were pursued by a group of the main GC contenders, initially with pacesetting by Sylwester Szmyd which reduced the size of the group, although contrary to expectations, yellow jersey wearer Thomas Voeckler remained with the leaders. With  remaining, Fränk Schleck broke clear of the yellow jersey group, but was unable to catch Sánchez and Vanendert, who took the first two places.  Within the final kilometre, Alberto Contador lost time to some of his main rivals for the overall competition, Ivan Basso, Cadel Evans and Andy Schleck.

Stage 13
15 July 2011 — Pau to Lourdes, 

From the original ten man breakaway, three riders, Jérémy Roy, Thor Hushovd and David Moncoutié, went clear on the highest category ascent to the Col d'Aubisque, with Roy leading over the top by nearly a minute from Moncoutié, with Hushovd more than a minute further behind.  Roy's lead over the peloton at that point was over 8 minutes, and he became leader of the King of the Mountain competition.  On the descent, Hushovd caught Moncoutie and the pair pursued Roy until Hushovd, who had worn the yellow jersey for 7 stages earlier in the race, dropped Moncountie inside the last , and passed Roy to win the stage: Moncoutié eventually took second place.  Most of the other riders from the early break stayed clear of the peloton, from which Philippe Gilbert, accompanied by Bauke Mollema, broke away on the descent to regain his place in the top ten overall and gain some points over the other contenders in the points competition.  There was little other change in the general classification, with the main peloton coming in some seven and a half minutes behind Hushovd, but Andreas Klöden withdrew earlier in the stage having suffered injuries earlier in the race.

Stage 14
16 July 2011 — Saint-Gaudens to Plateau de Beille, 

This stage had six categorised climbs.  From the original break, which had as many as 24 members but was disrupted by several breaks from among the group, Sandy Casar of  had the virtual lead at one point, but by the beginning of the last climb, to the highest category finish at Plateau de Beille his lead was little over two minutes.  On the steeper lower slopes of the climb the chase group was reduced to the eight leading men in the general classification, Voeckler's teammate Pierre Rolland, Rigoberto Urán, who took the white jersey for the leading young rider at the end of the stage, Jean-Christophe Péraud, and Jelle Vanendert. After three abortive attempts by Andy Schleck to split the group, Vanendert broke from the select group of favourites with some  remaining, and was the first to overtake Casar, but only Damiano Cunego was unable to stay with the group.  Ivan Basso put the group under further pressure, but Samuel Sánchez was the only one to make any meaningful pursuit of Vanendert, with those two riders reversing the finishing positions from stage 12.  Andy Schleck gained two seconds over the group in the final few hundred metres, and Vanendert's stage victory also earned him the leadership of the mountains category.

Stage 15
17 July 2011 — Limoux to Montpellier, 

On the last largely flat stage before the final day of the race, the main breakaway group of the day had five members; and was established from the beginning of the stage. The group—Mickaël Delage, Niki Terpstra, Samuel Dumoulin, Mikhail Ignatiev and Anthony Delaplace—was never more than three minutes clear of the peloton and as the catch approached, Ignatiev and Terpstra moved clear of their colleagues. Terpstra was the last member of the group to be caught, with about  remaining; despite some attempts at late breakaways including one by Philippe Gilbert, sprinters dominated the finish, with Mark Cavendish winning his fourth stage of the race ahead of Tyler Farrar and Alessandro Petacchi.

Stage 16
19 July 2011 — Saint-Paul-Trois-Châteaux to Gap, 

The first stage to enter the Alps had a very high pace for the first two hours, with no break from the peloton until the second half of the stage.  Ten riders eventually moved clear of the peloton, but extended their margin rapidly to six minutes.  After an unsuccessful attempt to move ahead of the bunch by Mikhail Ignatiev, Ryder Hesjedal got clear to lead over the category 2 mountain.  He was eventually caught by his teammate Thor Hushovd and another Norwegian, Edvald Boasson Hagen, before Hushovd went on to win the stage, his second of the tour.  On the ascent of the Col de Manse, Alberto Contador made two attacks, the second of which was successful, with Cadel Evans and Samuel Sánchez joining him in taking a time advantage on the stage over the other riders in contention for high placings in the general classification, and more than a minute over Andy Schleck.

Stage 17
20 July 2011 — Gap to Pinerolo (Italy), 

This stage had five categorised climbs, but as with the preceding stage, finished with a descent. More than  had passed before any break was established, but a group of fourteen riders finally got clear and extended their lead to over eight minutes. From that group, Rubén Pérez broke away to be first over the Col de Sestriere, but was caught by a counterattack on the final climb initiated by Sylvain Chavanel, which also included Edvald Boasson Hagen, Bauke Mollema and Jonathan Hivert. Boasson Hagen led over the final mountain and retained his lead on the descent to win the stage, while Hivert left the road twice and thus enabled Mollema to take second place. Among the General Classification contenders both Alberto Contador and Andy Schleck were aggressive on the last climb, but were unable to drop their opponents, while on the descent an attack initiated by yellow jersey wearer Thomas Voeckler, accompanied by Contador and Samuel Sánchez, was able to escape the group. Voeckler went off the road on two corners on the descent; and although Contador and Sánchez were able to stay clear for most of the descent, they were caught by a group that included all the other members of the top eight in the overall ranking—apart from Voeckler and Ivan Basso, who both conceded 27 seconds to their rivals.

Stage 18
21 July 2011 — Pinerolo (Italy) to Col du Galibier–Serre Chevalier, 

This stage had three highest category climbs, including both the highest point of the 2011 Tour and the highest finish in the history of the race. A group of 14 riders made a break after , and their lead reached nine minutes, but dropped to five and a half by the time Maxim Iglinsky led over the Col Agnel. The lead group had been reduced to six by the top of the second climb, the Col d'Izoard, which Iglinski again passed first, but by this time the group of favourites for the overall race had been affected by a solo attack by Andy Schleck. He gained two minutes on the remaining part of that climb, and had assistance from Joost Posthuma and Maxime Monfort, members of his  team who had been in the early break. Cadel Evans was the pace setter for the group in pursuit of Schleck, and some of the leading challengers lost time to the pursuing group, including Alberto Contador and Samuel Sánchez. Andy Schleck's winning margin was reduced at the end of the stage to a little over two minutes, with his brother Fränk passing the remnants of the chase group to take second place. Thomas Voeckler retained the overall race lead, although his advantage was reduced to 15 seconds. More than half the field finished outside the cut-off time for elimination, but were reprieved and instead penalised by the loss of 20 points, which meant that José Joaquín Rojas moved to 15 points behind Mark Cavendish in the competition for the green jersey.

Stage 19
22 July 2011 — Modane to Alpe d'Huez, 

This was the shortest stage of the tour, other than time trials, and featured three mountains. Although a 14-man break had moved ahead of the peloton within the first , the race was animated by a break by Alberto Contador after . He was joined in the break by yellow jersey wearer Thomas Voeckler, Andy Schleck and Cadel Evans, but another acceleration  later left only Schleck able to stay with Contador. Evans soon afterwards had a mechanical issue with his bicycle, and waited for the peloton to catch him up, while Voeckler opted to try to follow Contador and Schleck alone. By the top of the first climb, the Col du Télégraphe, Contador and Schleck had passed most of the first breakaway group, and in passing the col second behind Gorka Izagirre, Schleck became virtual leader of the mountains classification on the last day that points were available in that competition.

The climb to the Col du Galibier saw the front group reduced to four men: Contador, Schleck, Rui Costa and Christophe Riblon; Samuel Sánchez counter-attacked to join the group on the descent, while Voeckler dropped to the pursuit group that included the other leading riders in the general classification. The advantage of the leaders over the chase group dropped from its maximum of nearly two minutes to 42 seconds by the top of the Galibier, by which time Voeckler had been dropped to a third group. The chase group caught up with the leaders by the bottom of the valley, and the larger group was also joined by the yellow jersey group before the beginning of the climb to Alpe d'Huez. Ryder Hesjedal and Pierre Rolland had attacked along the valley, and led by some 38 seconds at the beginning of the climb. Attacks at the foot of the climb by Jakob Fuglsang, and then by Evans and Bauke Mollema, were unable to escape the group, but Contador was again able to break clear. When he caught Rolland and Hesjedal, the Canadian immediately fell away, while Rolland was able to stay with Contador for some time. The following group gradually diminished in numbers, and Voeckler dropped back, eventually finishing in 20th place. Shortly after Contador moved clear into the lead on his own, with  remaining, Peter Velits and Sánchez broke from the pursuit group. Sánchez caught up with Rolland, and the pair drew closer to Contador, while the two favourites for the general classification, Andy Schleck and Cadel Evans, rode in close proximity.

Sánchez and Rolland caught up with the rapidly tiring Contador with  remaining, and Rolland immediately attacked and went on to win the stage and take the lead in the young riders' competition. The two Spaniards worked together for a while, before Sánchez, in an effort that was to secure him the polka-dot jersey of the top climber, moved on to take second place. Despite a flurry of late attacks, Evans and both Schleck brothers finished on the same time. Andy Schleck assumed leadership of the overall classification. As had happened on the previous stage, more than half the field had to rely on a reprieve from the commissionaires having missed the cut-off time, but the penalty points made little difference to the green jersey competition as the two leaders in that classification both received the same sanction.

Stage 20
23 July 2011 — Grenoble,  individual time trial (ITT)

In the final competitive stage of the race, riders left in reverse order of their standings in the general classification.  Fabian Cancellara, the world champion at the time trial, was widely considered favourite to win the stage, and his time was the fastest for some time, but it was surpassed by Richie Porte and, shortly after, by Thomas De Gendt, before Tony Martin set the best time at every intermediate checkpoint, and at the stage finish, times which remained unbeaten.  Pierre Rolland, although he lost his place in the top ten to Jean-Christophe Péraud, was able to retain his lead in the young riders' category ahead of Rein Taaramäe.  Defending champion Alberto Contador, in posting the time which was second at the time, moved up one place in the overall rankings, before the final three riders, whose compared times were to be decisive in the final positions for the tour.  It was widely expected that the 57 second advantage that Andy Schleck had over Cadel Evans at the beginning of the stage would leave the pair very closely matched, but even by the first checkpoint in seemed evident that Evans would more than make up the deficit.  Evans beat Contador's time, to take second on the stage, and to pass both Andy and Fränk Schleck and assume the lead in the overall classification.

Stage 21
24 July 2011 — Créteil to Paris (Champs-Élysées), 

After a silent tribute to Laurent Fignon and the victims of the attacks in Oslo and Utøya Island, and in keeping with tradition, the final stage began at a slow pace, and was a largely ceremonial procession through the suburbs of Paris. Shortly after the riders reached the circuit in the centre of the city, racing began in earnest, and after various unsuccessful attempts, the main break was initiated by Ben Swift with 40 km to go, and he was joined by Kristjan Koren, Sergio Paulinho, Christophe Riblon and Lars Bak. At the intermediate sprint, with 35 km remaining, Mark Cavendish extended his lead in the points competition, and shortly after that the breakaway reached its greatest advantage at 45 seconds. The lead-out train for Cavendish led the race through the final corners, and he won the final stage for the third successive year, a record, to become the first British winner of the green jersey. The leaders of the other three categories finished in the peloton to secure their victories, and the traditional prize-giving was made shortly after the race.

Footnotes

References

Stage 12 To Stage 21
Tour de France stages